Krishna Dayal Sharma (6 September 1931 – 15 April 2010) was an Indian ambassador to Pakistan. He also served as the Indian High Commissioner in Mauritius, Tanzania and Australia. His final ambassadorial role was as head of mission in Madrid, Spain, from 1985-to 89.

Positions held 
1970-1971 Head, West Asia & North Africa Division, Ministry of External Affairs. 
From September 1974 to July 1978 he was High Commissioner to Dar es Salaam. Tanzania
1982-July 1985 Indian High Commissioner to Islamabad, Pakistan.
July 1985 Ambassador to Madrid. 
From August 1971 to August 1974 he was High Commissioner to Mauritius
From June 1980 to June 1982 he was High Commissioner to Canberra, Australia

References

1931 births
2010 deaths
Governors of Rajasthan
High Commissioners of India to Pakistan
High Commissioners of India to Tanzania
High Commissioners of India to Australia
High Commissioners of India to Mauritius
Ambassadors of India to Spain